Eo or EO may refer to:

Businesses and organizations 
 Education Otherwise, a home education organization
 Elevorganisasjonen, a Norwegian student organization
 Entrepreneurs' Organization, a nonprofit network
 Evangelische Omroep, a public broadcaster in the Netherlands
 Executive Outcomes, a South African military company
 Express One International, an airline
 Hewa Bora Airways (IATA code EO)

Language
 Eo (constructed language)
 Esperanto (ISO code EO), a constructed language
 eo (digraph), represents a single or two vowels in some languages

Science and technology

Computing 
 EO Personal Communicator, an early tablet computer produced by AT&T subsidiary EO, Inc.
 Eight Ones, a character code
 A line of tablet computers made by TabletKiosk

Other uses in science and technology
 "eo-" (derived from "Eos", meaning "dawn"), used to describe many early animals in the fossil record
 Earth observation
 Electro-optics
 Eosinophilic oesophagitis, or Eosinophilic esophagitis, an allergic inflammatory condition of the esophagus
 Ethylene oxide, a chemical compound
 Extremal optimization, a type of optimization heuristic inspired by self-organized criticality

Other uses 
 EO (film), a 2022 film
 EO (rapper), a rapper from London
 Eo (river), a river in Spain 
 Eo (instrument), a Korean percussion instrument
 East Otago, part of New Zealand's South Island
 Captain EO, a 3D film 
 Equal opportunity, a term related to civil rights
 Equipment Operator (US Navy), a Seabee occupational rating in the U.S. Navy
 Executive Officer, a person responsible for the running of an organization
 Executive order (United States), a directive issued by the President of the United States